Mimocalothyrza bottegoi is a species of beetle in the family Cerambycidae. It was described by Gestro in 1895, originally under the genus Calothyriza. It is known from Tanzania, Kenya, Ethiopia, and Somalia.

References

Phrynetini
Beetles described in 1895